The Old China Trail is a packed dirt trail along China Creek near its confluence with the South Fork of the Salmon River in the Payette National Forest, near Warren in Idaho County, Idaho.  It was listed on the National Register of Historic Places in 1990.

It runs from the Celadon Slope Garden down a southeast facing ridge to the Chi-Sandra Garden.

References

National Register of Historic Places in Idaho County, Idaho
Payette National Forest